Laudal is a former municipality located in the old Vest-Agder county in Norway. The  municipality existed from 1899 until 1964. The administrative centre of the municipality was the village of Laudal where Laudal Church is located.  The municipality encompassed part of what is now the municipality of Lindesnes in Agder county.

History
The municipality was established on 1 January 1899 when the old municipality of Øyslebø og Laudal was divided into two municipalities: Øyslebø (population: 991) and Laudal (population: 836). During the 1960s, there were many municipal mergers across Norway due to the work of the Schei Committee. On 1 January 1964, Laudal municipality was dissolved and its land was merged with parts of the neighboring municipalities of Øyslebø, Bjelland, and Finsland to create the new municipality of Marnardal. Prior to the merger, Laudal had a population of 560.

Name
The municipality (originally the parish) is named after the old Laudal farm, since that is the location of Laudal Church.  The first element of the name of the farm comes from the old name for the river, Laug, (now the Lågåna river) and the last element means "valley".  Therefore, the name means "Laug river valley".

Government
All municipalities in Norway, including Laudal, are responsible for primary education (through 10th grade), outpatient health services, senior citizen services, unemployment and other social services, zoning, economic development, and municipal roads.  The municipality was governed by a municipal council of elected representatives, which in turn elected a mayor.

Municipal council
The municipal council  of Laudal was made up of representatives that were elected to four year terms.  The party breakdown of the final municipal council was as follows:

See also
List of former municipalities of Norway

References

Lindesnes
Former municipalities of Norway
1899 establishments in Norway
1964 disestablishments in Norway